Mesosa expansa is an extinct species of beetle in the family Cerambycidae, that existed during the Lower to Middle Miocene. It was described by Hong in 1983.

References

expansa
Beetles described in 1983